Mylossoma is a genus of serrasalmids from tropical and subtropical South America, including the basins of the Amazon, Orinoco, Lake Maracaibo and Paraguay-Paraná. These common fish are found both in main river sections and floodplains. They support important fisheries and based on a review by IBAMA, they are the seventh most caught fish by weight in the Brazilian Amazon. They primarily feed on plant material such as seeds and fruits (to a lesser extent invertebrates), and in their ecology they generally resemble the larger tambaqui (Colossoma macropomum).

Species
There are currently 5 recognized species in this genus:

 Mylossoma acanthogaster (Valenciennes, 1850)
 Mylossoma albiscopum (Cope, 1872)
 Mylossoma aureum (Spix & Agassiz, 1829)
 Mylossoma duriventre (G. Cuvier, 1818)
 Mylossoma unimaculatum (Steindachner, 1908)

References

Serrasalmidae
Taxa named by Carl H. Eigenmann
Taxa named by Clarence Hamilton Kennedy
Fish of South America